Diego Alonso Roberto Penny (born 22 April 1984) is a Peruvian international footballer who plays professionally for Deportivo Garcilaso, as a goalkeeper. He stands at 1.97m tall.

Club career

Early career
Penny began his career in 2004 with Peruvian side Coronel Bolognesi, where he played 180 times.

Burnley
Penny signed a three-year contract for Burnley on 27 June 2008, making his debut on 9 August 2008 in a 4–1 loss against Sheffield Wednesday. After his debut, throughout the 2008–09 season and into his second year with Burnley, he was second-choice to Brian Jensen. Penny made his Premier League debut in the 2009–10 season, after coming on for the injured Jensen in a 3–1 home defeat by Wigan Athletic. On 16 August 2010 he left Burnley by mutual consent and returned to his homeland of Peru. Penny made a total of 4 appearances for Burnley in all competitions.

Juan Aurich
He joined Peruvian club Juan Aurich on 28 August 2010.

International career
Penny made his senior international debut for Peru in 2006.

References

External links
 

1984 births
Living people
Footballers from Lima
Association football goalkeepers
Peruvian footballers
Peru international footballers
Peruvian expatriate footballers
Sporting Cristal footballers
Coronel Bolognesi footballers
Burnley F.C. players
Juan Aurich footballers
FBC Melgar footballers
Club Deportivo Universidad de San Martín de Porres players
English Football League players
Premier League players
Peruvian Primera División players
2015 Copa América players
Copa América Centenario players
Expatriate footballers in England
Peruvian expatriate sportspeople in England
Deportivo Garcilaso players